The American Society for Clinical Pathology (ASCP) is a professional association based in Chicago, Illinois encompassing 130,000 pathologists and laboratory professionals.

Founded in 1922, the ASCP provides programs in education, certification and advocacy on behalf of patients, pathologists and lab professionals.  In addition, the ASCP publishes numerous textbooks, newsletters and other manuals, and publishes two industry journals: American Journal of Clinical Pathology and LabMedicine.

The ASCP also promotes National Medical Laboratory Professionals Week (NMLPW) as a time of recognition for medical laboratory personnel and a chance to celebrate their professionalism and be recognized for their efforts. National Lab Week is held annually during the last full week of April.

References

External links
 American Society for Clinical Pathology website

1922 establishments in the United States
Medical associations based in the United States
Pathology organizations
Medical and health professional associations in Chicago